= Dadonghai =

Waterfront in Sanya, Hainan, China

Dadonghai (simplified Chinese: 大东海; traditional Chinese: 大東海; pinyin: DàDōnghǎi) is the urban area, about two kilometers east of Sanya City. Sanya's beach culture originated at Dadonghai, a congested strip of sand near the city center. There are loads of water sports on offer at Dadonghai.

== Gallery ==
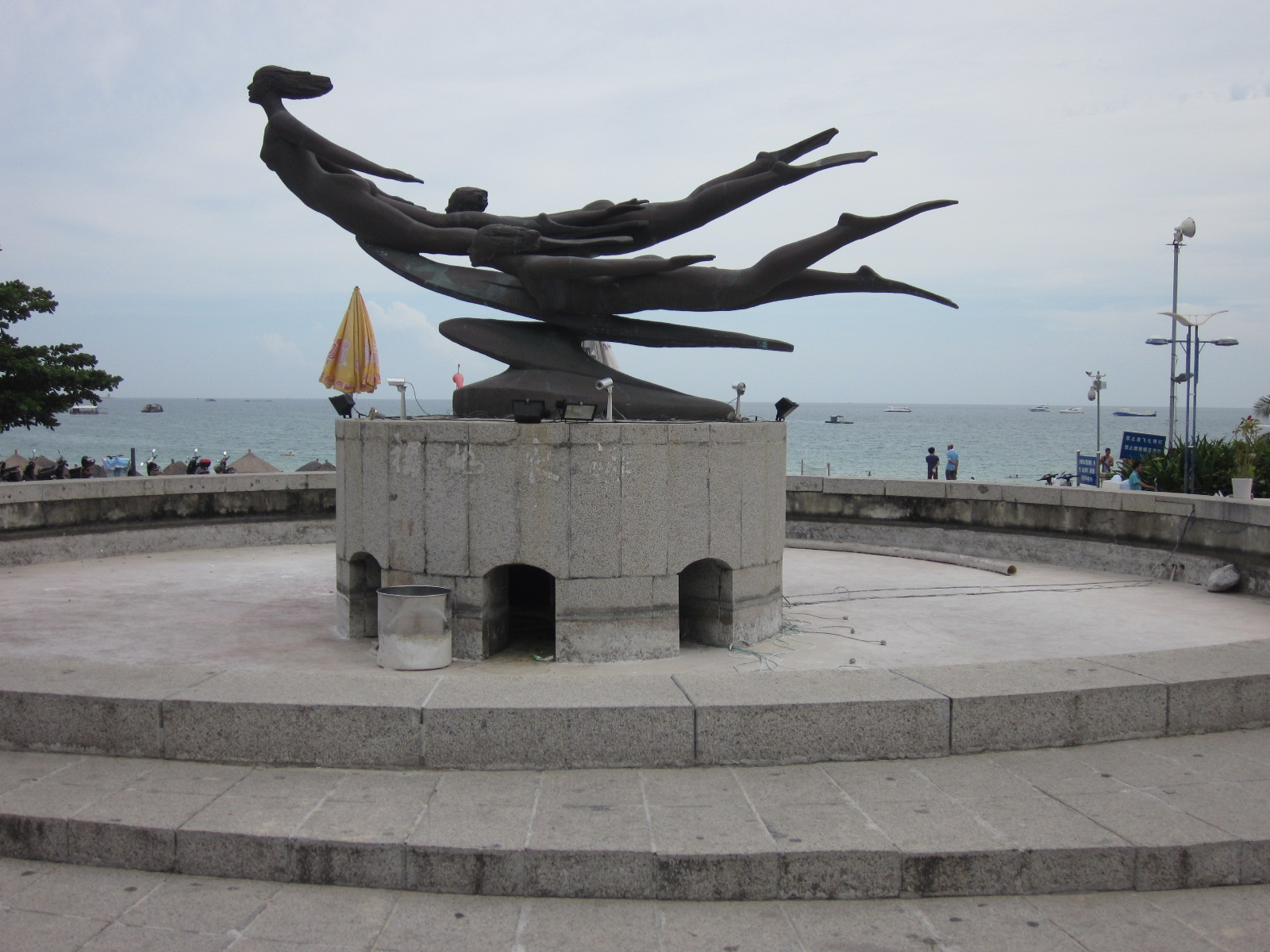
The square.

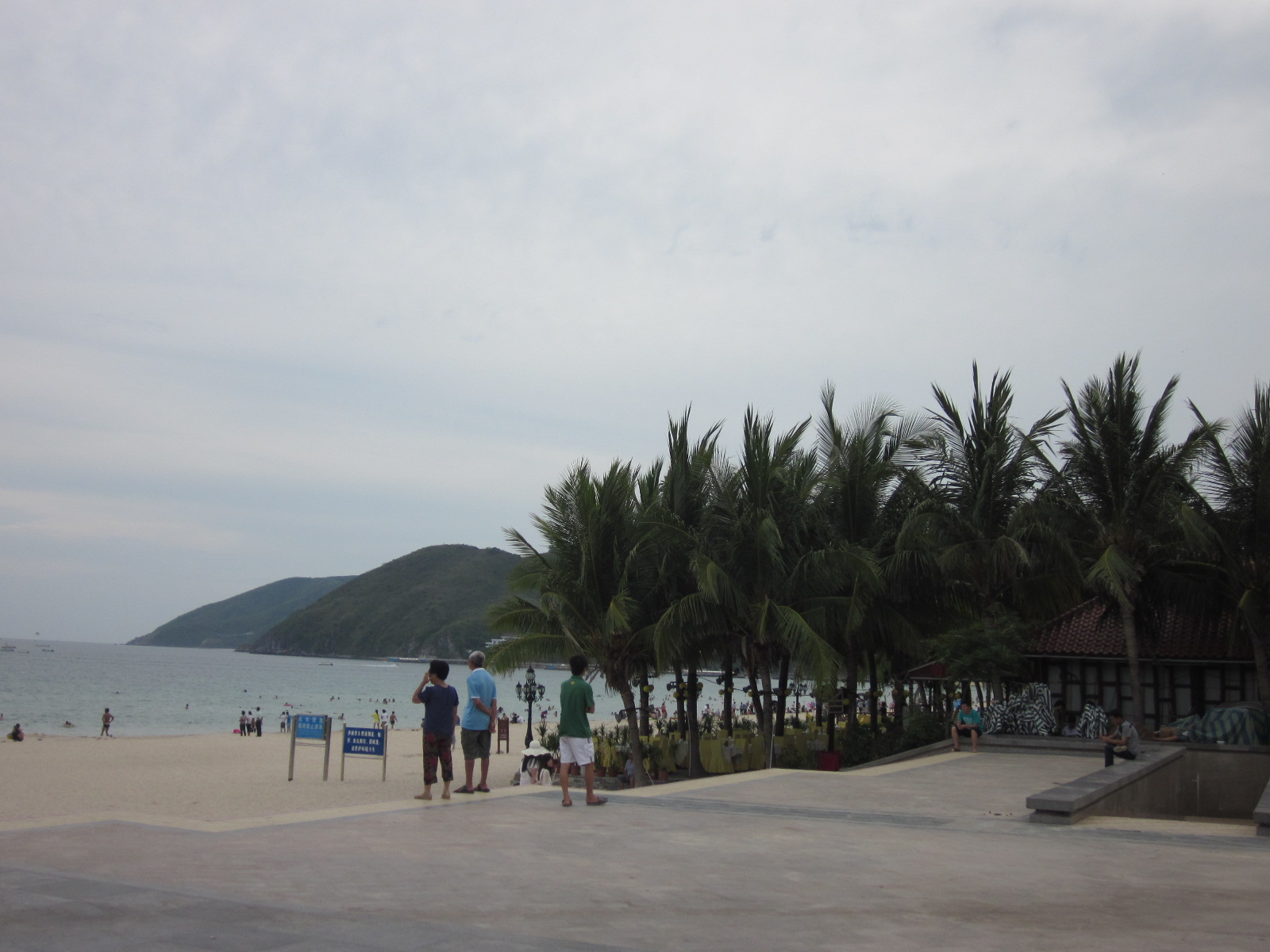
The seaside scenery.

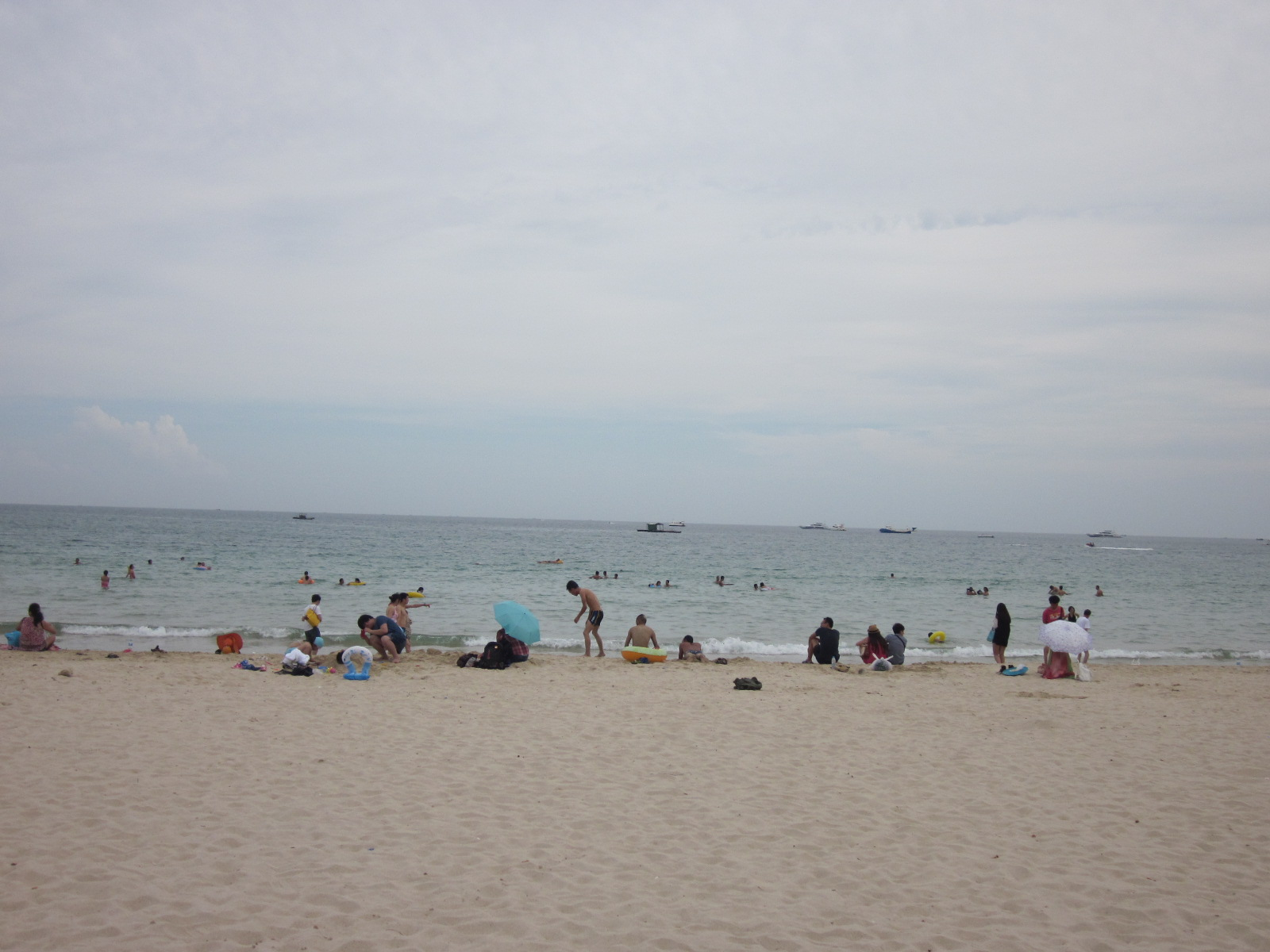
The seaside scenery.

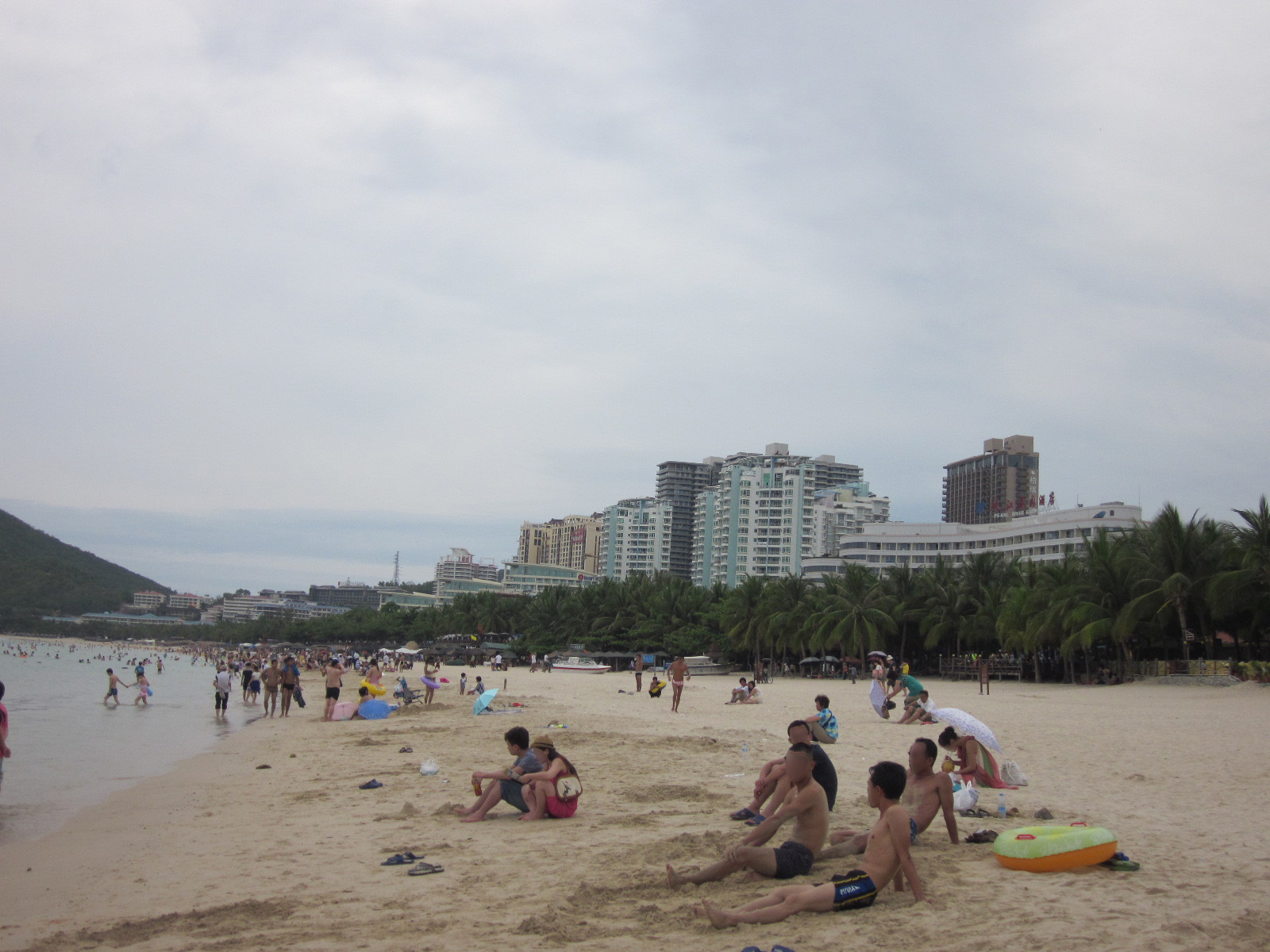
The seaside scenery.

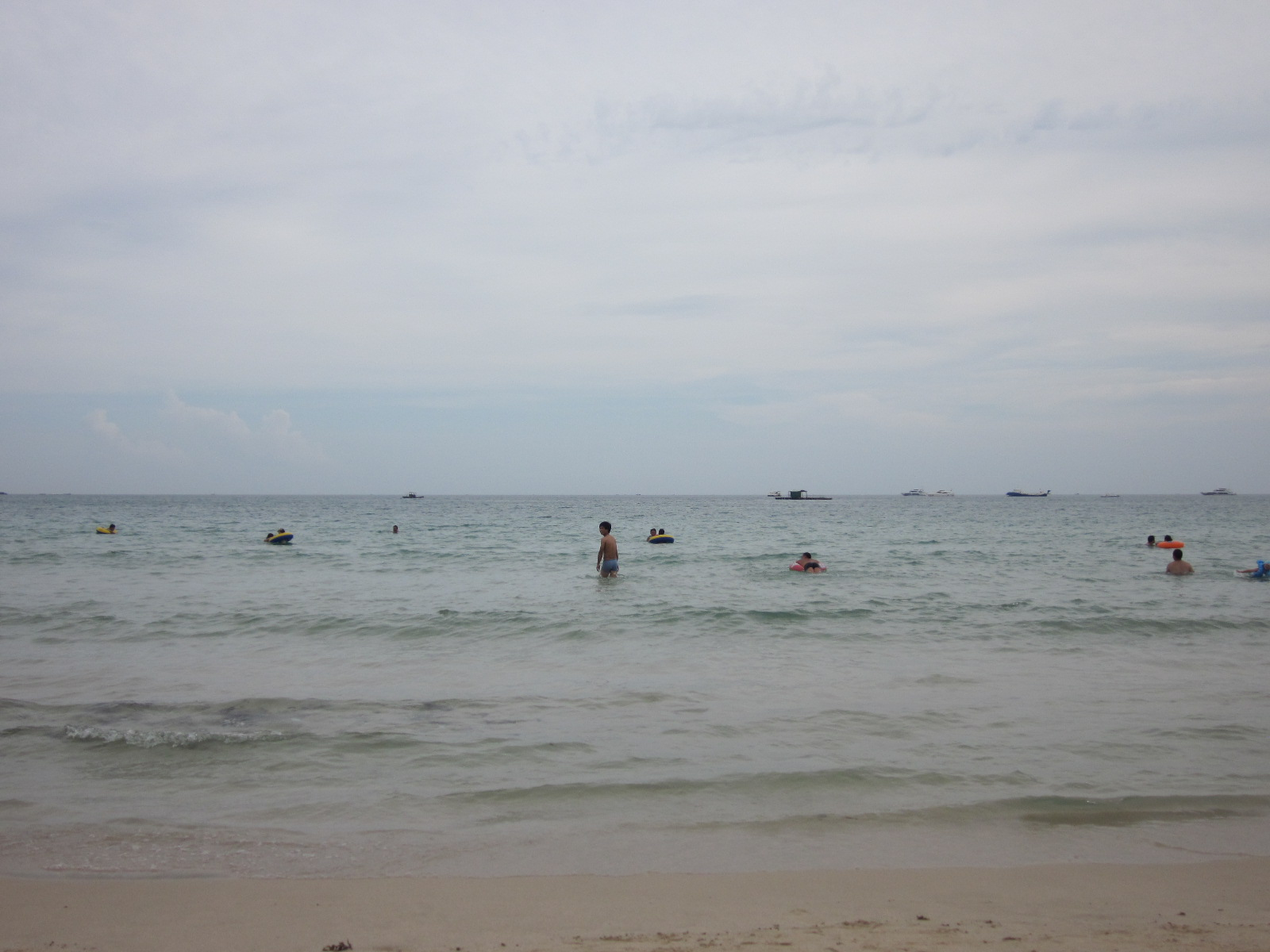
Dadonghai.

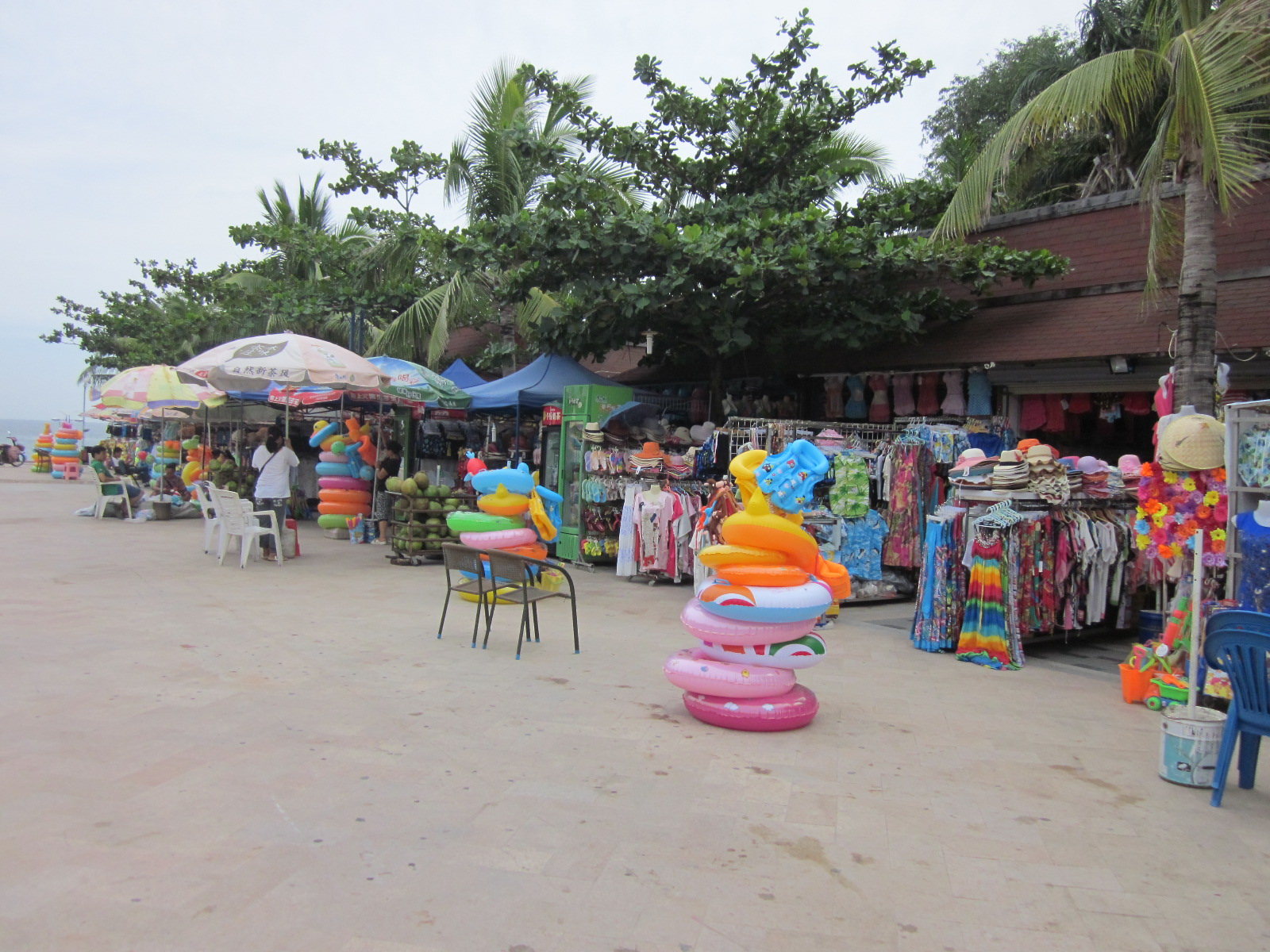
Shops.
